Leonhard Christian Borchgrevink Holmboe (10 October 1802 – 24 September 1887) was a Norwegian Lutheran minister and politician.

Personal life
He was born in Trondenes as the son of bailiff Jens Holmboe (1752–1804) and his wife Anna Margrethe Irgens (1766–1851). He had several brothers and sisters. His brothers Even and Hans became involved in politics, so did his nephew Jens Holmboe.

In 1828 he married Elisabeth Musæus, who hailed from Stavanger. The couple had seven sons and two daughters. Their grandson Cornelius Holmboe was Minister of Justice in 1928.

Career
He was elected to the Norwegian Parliament in 1836, representing the constituency of Nordlands Amt. He was elected again in 1842, representing the constituency of Finmarkens Amt. (which at that time included both Finnmark and Troms)

He worked as a minister, being appointed as vicar in Buksnes in 1827, dean in Tromsøe in 1839 and vicar in Jevnaker in 1860.

He died in 1887 in Kristiania.

References

1802 births
1887 deaths
Members of the Storting
Nordland politicians
Politicians from Tromsø
Norwegian priest-politicians
19th-century Norwegian people
Leonhard Christian Borchgrevink